Christine Chaladyniak (born 15 June 1968) is a German former footballer who played as a midfielder. She made two appearances for the Germany national team from 1986 to 1996.

References

External links
 

1968 births
Living people
German women's footballers
Women's association football midfielders
Germany women's international footballers
Place of birth missing (living people)